Eagle On The Hill is an unbounded locality in the Australian state of South Australia located in the suburb of Crafers West on the western face of the Adelaide Hills overlooking the Adelaide metropolitan area.  

The village is located on Mount Barker Road, which was formerly the connection from Adelaide to the South Eastern Freeway.  Once the freeway was extended through the Heysen Tunnels in 2000, through the ridge underneath Eagle On The Hill, the locality went into a precipitous decline.  It is now a relic of its former self; its restaurant, hotel, bottle shop and service stations have all closed, leaving behind a quiet suburb with a small resident population. Eagle On The Hill is now a very popular spot for downhill speedboarders who travel down the road at speeds close to 65 kilometres per hour.

Hotel

The Eagle on the Hill Hotel was built by George Stevenson in 1850  and initially was run as an eating-house, then opened in 1853 as an hotel by William Anderson, who named it Anderson Hotel.

Abraham Fordham was its lessee in 1854, naming it the "Eagle Inn", changing it to "Eagle on the Hill" in 1856. Fordham was found insolvent in 1861 but was able to continue trading until April 1864, when the lease on the "Eagle on the Hill" (better known as "Fordham's")  was re-advertised. Fordham, who previously ran a hotel on Grenfell Street, died at the hotel the following August.
His wife, Elizabeth Fordham, successfully applied for the licence, and died aged 68 at the hotel in September 1866. Their son, William Robert Fordham (died 1873), next had the licence, then transferred it to James Tighe (died 1876) in January 1869, but the association with the Fordhams continued for many years. 

The hotel has twice been ravaged by bushfires. First in 1899; a fire destroyed all of the old hotel with the exception of two rooms. Again on Ash Wednesday (16 February 1983) the hotel suffered, with it being completely destroyed. It was rebuilt and operated with much success until its closure after the construction of the new freeway route which carried the South Eastern Freeway through the Heysen Tunnels instead of up the ridge past the hotel. It is now a private residence.

External links
History of Eagle on the Hill

References

Geography of Adelaide